Maharastra State Highway 42, commonly referred to as Ghodbunder Road or G.B. Road, runs entirely through the district of Thane. It is one of the major roads leading out of Thane city and connects to the Eastern Express Highway coming from south at Kapurbawdi, which later becomes National Highway 3 at this junction  travels North-East. It also connects to the Western Express Highway coming from south at Ghodbunder village, which later becomes National Highway 8 at this junction traveling North-ward's towards Gujarat.

General information
Maharastra State Highway 42 is approximately 20 km long and links the two main arterial roads of Mumbai, the Eastern Express Highway and the Western Express Highway. It connects to Eastern Express Highway at Kapurbawdi village and Western Express Highway at Ghodbunder village. The Kapurbawdi bridge has been constructed to ease the traffic congestion. This highway is tolled by the MSRDC. This road skirts the northern boundary of Salsette Island providing scenic views of the Yeoor hills and the Thane creek.

Ghodbunder Road cuts across dense forests which form part of the Sanjay Gandhi National Park. It also skirts the Vasai Creek for most of its route and overlooks the forest from across the creek. In spite of development encroaching on the forest, much of flora and fauna continue to survive and prosper. Ghodbunder Road is lined with numerous historical monuments like the Ghodbunder Fort. Naglakot, Gaimukh Gadi and Firangkot, which although damaged now, unfold stories of the 1500 century era reign of the Portuguese.

This road once played a crucial role in Indo-Arab trade and later the Portuguese used it to monopolise sea routes in the Arabian Sea, at one point acted as a bridge between distant cultures. Several empires fought wars to control it. The Persian horses that came from the Arab countries used to land in the port (bunder) at the west end of this road. Hence, it initially came to be known as Ghodegaon (horse village). Around the time of Chhatrapati Shivaji in the later centuries that the road got named after the port, and was called Ghodbunder Road.

Locals say that till 1950, it was only a dirt road with residents of centuries old villages like Waghbil, Majhiwada, Patlipada, Ghodbunder, Kolshet and Kasarwadavli using bullock carts for transport. The surrounding forests had considerable plants like cashew, mangoes that were brought in by the Portuguese. The area was very rich in flora and fauna.

Mumbai Metro Line 4 (Upcoming) 

Green Line 4 of the Mumbai Metro, currently under construction, is part of the metro system for the city of Mumbai, India and is being developed by MMRDA and a consortium of international companies.

The  line is planned to be fully elevated, and is expected to consist of 32 stations from Wadala, Mumbai to Kasarvadavali via Ghatkopar, Mulund. It is estimated to cost . Its construction was expected to begin by June 2018.

It is expected to be completed in 2022 and is expected to provide interconnectivity among the existing Eastern Express Highway, Central Railway, Mono Rail, the ongoing Metro Line 2B (D N Nagar to Mandale), and the proposed Metro Line 5 (Thane to Kalyan), Metro Line 6 (Swami Samarth Nagar to Vikhroli) and Metro Line 11 (Wadala to CSMT). It will provide rail based access to the commercial, government bodies and geographical landmarks in Mumbai. It will reduce the current travel time by between 50% and 75% depending on road conditions.

Major junctions

The following roads either emanate from it or are crossed by it. This list has been separated by district and talukas for easy reading.

Gallery

See also
List of State Highways in Maharashtra

References

Transport in Thane
State Highways in Maharashtra